Autodrome de Montlhéry (established 4 October 1924) is a motor racing circuit, officially called L’autodrome de Linas-Montlhéry, owned by Utac, located south-west of the small town of Montlhéry about  south of Paris.

History 

It was initially called Autodrome Parisien, and had especially high banking. A road circuit was added in 1925.

The first race there, the 1925 French Grand Prix, was held on 26 July 1925 and organised by The Automobile Club de France Grand Prix. It was a race in which Robert Benoist in a Delage won; Antonio Ascari died in an Alfa Romeo P2. The Grand Prix revisited the track in 1927 and each year between 1931 and 1937.

In 1939 the track was sold to the government, deprived of maintenance, and again sold to Union technique de l’automobile et du cycle (UTAC) in December 1946.

The last certification for racing was gained in 2001.

Motorcar races
The first race, the 1925 French Grand Prix, was held on 26 July 1925 and organised by the Automobile Club de France. Robert Benoist in a Delage won; but Antonio Ascari died in a crash of his Alfa Romeo P2.

In July 1926 Violette Cordery lead a team that averaged  for  driving an Invicta, and became the first woman to be awarded the Dewar Trophy by the Royal Automobile Club.

The Grand Prix revisited the track in 1927.

In 1929, Hellé Nice drove an Oméga-Six to victory in the all-female Grand Prix of the third Journée Feminine at the Autodrome de Linas-Montlhéry.

The Grand Prix revisited the track each year between 1931 and 1937.

The "Coupe du Salon", "Grand Prix de l'Age d'Or" and the "1000 km" were arranged irregularly since then, as the track has had several high-speed problems.

Motorcycle races
The Grand Prix de France (UMF French Federation) was organized in Linas-Montlhéry in 1925, 1931, 1935 and 1937 with the best worldwide racers.

A competitor Grand Prix de France (MCF Club) was also organized from 1924 to 1937 with the best French and British racers.

The Bol d'or, the well-known French motorcycle endurance race of 24 hours, was held in Linas-Montlhéry before the Second War from 1937 to 1939, and after the Second War in 1949, in 1950, from 1952 to 1960, in 1969 and in 1970. British motorcycles  were victorious usually from 1931 to 1959, (Velocette, Norton or Triumph); American Harley-Davidson, French Motobécane, German BMW, Italian Moto Guzzi, Austrian Puch and Czechoslovakian Jawa won only once. The year after, two riders were allowed. In 1969, a Japanese bike, Honda Four, wins for the first time. In 1970, a British one, Triumph Trident, wins for the last time.

Another race open the year in France, the Côte Lapize, climbing around the hill of Saint-Eutrope : the new engines confidentially prepared during the winter months were shown. In early 1950s, Pierre Monneret riding the famous Gilera Four, 500 cc, sent by the official Italian team, was one of them.

Some races were open to production motorcycles like the Coupe du Salon (morning for motorcycles, afternoon for motorcars) or the Coupes Eugène Mauve.

Fatal accidents at Autodrome de Montlhéry include Benoît Nicolas Musy (1956), and the one in which Peter Lindner, Franco Patria and three flag marshals died in 1964.

Other events
In 1933 the circuit hosted the UCI Road World Championships for cycling.

In 2010 the Speed Ring played host to Ken Block's Gymkhana Three video, an advertisement for his company, DC Shoes.

Layout configurations

Lap records

The official race lap records at Autodrome de Linas-Montlhéry are listed as:

Further reading
William Boddy, Montlhéry, the story of the Paris autodrome

Notes

References

External links
Montlhery.com Website about Autodrome de Linas-Montlhéry
Autodrome de Linas-Montlhéry on Stades Mythiques
Paris Autodrome News
Association pour le soutien de l'autodrome de Linas-Montlhéry
Historic Purpose Built Grand Prix Circuits on Google Maps

Motorsport venues in France
Montlhery
Road test tracks
Sports venues in Essonne
Linas-Montlhery